George T. Darany (born March 12, 1956) is a retired Democratic politician from Michigan, who served in the Michigan House of Representatives from 2011 to 2017.

Darany is currently the City Clerk in the City of Dearborn, Michigan, is a former member of Dearborn City Council, was the founder and owner of a small business, Classic Trolley Company from 1986–2006, and has worked as a realtor and associate broker for RE/MAX TEam 2000 in Dearborn for 25 years.

Darany married Maria Marzolo, owner of Liberta Cleaning Team, on November 10, 2018.

References

Living people
1956 births
Democratic Party members of the Michigan House of Representatives
Michigan city council members
Politicians from Detroit
Politicians from Dearborn, Michigan
University of Michigan–Dearborn alumni
21st-century American politicians